John William Kitson (1846 – February 6, 1888) was an English-born architectural sculptor who worked in the United States.

Early life
Kitson, the third child and the first-born son of John McWhire and Emma Jaggar Kitson, was born in 1846 in Berry Brow, Huddersfield. He was sent to London at the age of 14 as an apprentice to learn the art of stone and wood sculpturing. By 1870 he was living in Philadelphia with other architects and sculptors.

Sculptor career
Kitson was active in the United States 1868 – 1888 as a sculptor of wood and stone.  He and his fellow Englishman, Robert Ellin, joined forces 1n 1874 under the name Robert Ellin Co and created an architectural sculptor partnership, Ellin & Kitson, based in New York City in 1879.  Just prior to Kitson's 1888 death, the firm became known as Ellin, Kitson & Co.  Kitson's estate remained as partner in the firm until 1904 when his eldest child reached maturity.  This also coincided with Robert Ellin's death.

According to family oral stories Kitson and Ellin decided to compete in a juried show for the 1876 centennial as Americans to set themselves apart from other English entrants. Their mahogany breakfront won an award and has been noted in articles about the 1876 centennial show.  In this exhibit they also showed examples of their church furnishings.

Neither William nor his partner Robert were known for fine art sculpture. Instead, their work was seen as a part of the exterior and interior of churches and commercial buildings and elegant homes; their work also included carved furniture such as seen in the 1876 Centennial 
Exposition held in Philadelphia, PA.

Kitson has been attributed with carving stone columns of the National Art Institute NYC now known as the National Academy. These have been lost. His work is also seen in an upstairs meeting room of the Tilden Mansion, now the  National Arts Club, in a carved frieze of birds against a gold leaf ground.   Circa 1872 at Philadelphia's First Presbyterian Church on Walnut, Kitson and Alexander M. Calder carved all exterior and interior stone and woodwork. According to family oral history, he was known for his bird sculptures. One of his beautiful breakfronts is still in family hands.  An example of his birds in walnut is also in family hands.

Kitson married 1882 to Mary Ann Morrell, also known as May Kitson, whose family arrived in New Jersey from London, England in 1873. In February 1888 he died at the age of 43 of back injuries, leaving his 25-year-old wife with a son Howard Waldo age 5 and an infant daughter Velma Mary aged 8 months.  He is buried in Woodlawn. Velma Mary later married Byron McCandless and was the grandmother of Astronaut Bruce McCandless.

Brothers
All four Kitson brothers (Will, Sam, Harry and Rob) moved to the United States.  Samuel James Kitson, a fine sculptor, attended the Rome Academy 1870 – 1873.  He was promoted by Ellin & Kitson while he developed his own career beginning 1878.  Younger brother Harry, Henry Hudson Kitson, was sent at the age of 14 to apprentice with John William and Samuel James and then moved to Paris for his sculpturing education.  The youngest brother, Robert Lewellen Kitson, arrived in the United States following his mother's death in 1898.  Robert displayed some watercolors in the English Royal Academy of the Arts. He was a watercolorist of whose work very little is known to survive.

References

"In Pursuit of Beauty"  Metropolitan Museum of Art NYC
New York Times February 1888
"Stories in Stone on Walnut Street" Center City Quarterly June 2010
Family letters, photos and legal documents held by family historian
George Titus Ferris, Gems of the Centennial Exhibition 1877, D Appleton & Co Publishers NYC Pages 136-139
New York NY Tribune May 4, 1902 Page 2, American Art Industries Wood Carving
Stone; an Illustrated Magazine - Google Books Result 1894 Vol 9 Page 470
 Stone; an Illustrated Magazine - Google Books Result 1902 Vol 24-Editorial "The Founder of American Architectural Decoration" pages 342-345
Real Estate Record and Builders' Guide August 10, 1901 Mortgages and Assignments Borough of Manhattan
The Critic: An Illustrated Monthly Review of Literature, Art 1893 Vol 22-23 Pages 391-2
Building Trades Employers Association Vol 5 1904 page 56
Great Britain Patent Office "The Commissioner of Patents Journal" August 11, 1874 
Columbia University Press, NYC, W. Craven, 'Stanford White: Decorator in Opulence and Dealer in Antiquitie'
"Royal Academy of Arts: A Complete Dictionary of Contributors Vol 4" Page 336 
newspapers.rawson.lib.mi.us/enterprise/CCE_1895_A%20(E)/issues/06-14- 1895_6.pdf "BIGGEST BRONZE CASTING"
Yearbook of the Architectural League and Catalogue Vol 14 Pages 133, 137
George Titus Ferris, Gems of the Centennial Exhibition D Appleton & Co Publishers NYC 1877 Pages 136-139

1846 births
1888 deaths
English sculptors
English male sculptors
British woodworkers
People from Huddersfield
19th-century British sculptors